Zhengdao Ye is an Australia-based Chinese linguist who specializes in semantics, pragmatics, translation studies and intercultural communication. She is a lecturer at the Australian National University. She has contributed to the development of NSM semantics in Mandarin and Shanghainese, to the study of the semantics of nouns, and the semantics of emotion.

References

Linguists from Australia
Women linguists
Living people
Linguists from China
East China Normal University alumni
Australian National University alumni
Academic staff of the Australian National University
Year of birth missing (living people)